The 2020 Volta a la Comunitat Valenciana (English: Tour of the Valencian Community) was held from 5 to 9 February 2020 and was the 71st edition of the Volta a la Comunitat Valenciana. It was a 2.Pro event on the 2020 UCI Europe Tour, as well as part of the inaugural UCI ProSeries. The race was run entirely in the autonomous community of Valencia with five stages covering 800.2 kilometers, starting in Castelló de la Plana and finishing in Valencia.

The race was won by Slovenian Tadej Pogačar of the  team.

Teams

Twenty-one teams were invited to the race. These teams consisted of twelve UCI WorldTeams, seven UCI Professional Continental teams, and two UCI Continental teams. Of the 145 riders that started the race, 137 finished.

UCI WorldTeams

 
 
 
 
 
 
 
 
 
 
 
 

UCI Professional Continental Teams

 
 
 
 
 
 
 

UCI Continental Teams

Route

Stages

Stage 1
5 February 2020 — Castelló de la Plana to Villarreal,

Stage 2
6 February 2020 — Torrent to Cullera,

Stage 3
7 February 2020 — Orihuela to Torrevieja,

Stage 4
8 February 2020 — Calp to Sierra de Bernia,

Stage 5
9 February 2020 — Paterna to Valencia,

Classification leadership table

Classification standings

General classification

Points classification

Mountains classification

Young rider classification

Teams classification

References

External links

 

2020
2020 UCI Europe Tour
2020 UCI ProSeries
2020 in Spanish road cycling
February 2020 sports events in Spain